Daniel Westlin (born 24 January 1980) is a retired Swedish football striker.

References

1980 births
Living people
Swedish footballers
IFK Göteborg players
Gefle IF players
Association football forwards
Superettan players
Allsvenskan players